Morell is both a surname and a given name. Notable people with the name include:

Surname 
 Abelardo Morell (born 1948), Boston-based photographer
 Alvin Morell Bentley (1918-1969), politician from the U.S. state of Michigan
 André Morell (1909–1978), British actor
 Barry Morell (1927-2003), American operatic tenor
 Curdin Morell (born 1963), Swiss bobsledder
 George Morell (Michigan jurist) (1786–1845), American jurist
 George W. Morell (1815–1883), civil engineer, lawyer, farmer, and a Union general in the American Civil War
 Gladys Morrell (1888–1969) was a Bermudian suffragette leade
 John Daniel Morell (1816–1891), British educationalist
 José Abreu Morell (1864–1889), Cuban painter
 Juliana Morell (1594–1653), Spanish Dominican nun
 Marty Morell (born 1944), drummer, percussionist, vibraphonist and producer 
 Mayo Fuster Morell (born 1975), Spanish social researcher
 Michael Morell (born 1958), former Deputy Director of the Central Intelligence Agency
 Monica Morell (1953-2008), Swiss singer
 Peter Andreas Amundsen Morell (1868–1948), Norwegian Minister of Social Affairs
 Theodor Morell (1886–1948), Adolf Hitler's personal physician
 Raquel Morell (born 1959), Mexican actress
 Roy Morell (1889-1961), Australian wool broker, grazier and stockbroker
 Thomas Morell (1703-1784), English librettist, classical scholar and Fellow of the Royal Society

Given name 
 Alvin Morell Bentley (1918–1969), American diplomat
 Morell Mackenzie (1837–1892), British physician

Characters 
 Rowanne Morell, a fictional police officer on the television police procedural The Bill

See also
 Morel (surname)